Jawahar Navodaya Vidyalaya, South Andaman is a boarding, co-educational  school in South Andaman district of Andaman and Nicobar Islands, a U.T. in India. JNV South Andaman is funded by the Indian Ministry of Human Resources Development and administered  by Navodaya Vidyalaya Smiti, an autonomous body under the ministry. Navodaya Vidyalayas offer free education to talented children, from Class VI to XII.

History 
This school is located in temporary premises at village Chouldari, in Govt. Middle School. The permanent campus is being constructed at Port Mouth. This school is administered and monitored by Hyderabad regional office of Navodaya Vidyalaya Smiti.

Admission 
Admission to JNV Car Nicobar at class VI level is made through selection test conducted by Navodaya Vidyalaya Smiti. The information about test is disseminated and advertised in district by the office of South Andaman  district magistrate (Collector), who is also the chairperson of school Vidyalya Management Committee (VMC).

See also 

 Jawahar Navodaya Vidyalaya, Car Nicobar
 Jawahar Navodaya Vidyalaya, Middle Andaman
 List of JNV schools

References

External links 

South Andaman
South Andaman district
Educational institutions established in 2017
2017 establishments in the Andaman and Nicobar Islands